Morgan County is a county located in the U.S. state of Colorado. As of the 2020 census, the population was 29,111. The county seat is Fort Morgan. The county was named after old Fort Morgan, which in turn was named in honor of Colonel Christopher A. Morgan.

Morgan County comprises the Fort Morgan, CO Micropolitan Statistical Area.

Geography

Adjacent counties
Logan County - northeast
Washington County - east, southeast
Adams County - southwest
Weld County - north, west

Major highways
  Interstate 76
 
  U.S. Highway 6
  U.S. Highway 34
  State Highway 39
  State Highway 52
  State Highway 71
  State Highway 144

State protected area
Jackson Lake State Park

Trails and byways
American Discovery Trail
Pawnee Pioneer Trails
South Platte Trail

Demographics

At the 2000 census there were 27,171 people, 9,539 households, and 6,973 families living in the county.  The population density was 21 people per square mile (8/km2). There were 10,410 housing units at an average density of 8 per square mile (3/km2).  The racial makeup of the county was 79.65% White, 0.33% Black or African American, 0.81% Native American, 0.17% Asian, 0.17% Pacific Islander, 16.37% from other races, and 2.48% from two or more races. 31.18% of the population were Hispanic or Latino of any race.
Of the 19,539 households 37.90% had children under the age of 18 living with them, 59.70% were married couples living together, 9.00% had a female householder with no husband present, and 26.90% were non-families. 23.00% of households were one person and 10.90% were one person aged 65 or older. The average household size was 2.80 and the average family size was 3.29.

The age distribution was 30.40% under the age of 18, 8.50% from 18 to 24, 28.20% from 25 to 44, 19.80% from 45 to 64, and 13.00% 65 or older. The median age was 34 years. For every 100 females there were 100.40 males. For every 100 females age 18 and over, there were 98.30 males.

The median household income was $34,568 and the median family income  was $39,102. Males had a median income of $27,361 versus $21,524 for females. The per capita income for the county was $15,492. About 8.50% of families and 12.40% of the population were below the poverty line, including 15.30% of those under age 18 and 9.50% of those age 65 or over.

Communities

Cities
Brush
Fort Morgan

Towns
Hillrose
Log Lane Village
Wiggins

Census-designated places

Blue Sky
Jackson Lake
Morgan Heights
Orchard
Saddle Ridge
Snyder
Trail Side
Weldona

Other unincorporated communities
Goodrich
Hoyt

Politics
Morgan County has long been one of the Republican Party's major strongholds in Colorado. It was one of only three Colorado counties (the others being El Paso County and Larimer County) to vote for the re-election of Herbert Hoover in 1932, and the only Democrat to obtain an absolute majority in the county since 1920 has been Lyndon Johnson in 1964 – although Roosevelt did win a plurality in 1936.

In other statewide elections, the county also leans strongly Republican, although it was carried by Democrat Roy Romer in 1990 – when he carried all but four counties statewide – by Dick Lamm in 1982  and by Constitution Party candidate Tom Tancredo in 2010.

See also

Fort Morgan Micropolitan Statistical Area
National Register of Historic Places listings in Morgan County, Colorado

Notes

References

External links
Morgan County Government website
Colorado County Evolution by Don Stanwyck
Colorado Historical Society

 

 
Colorado counties
1889 establishments in Colorado
Eastern Plains
Populated places established in 1889